Albert Elias (16 May 1971 in Dallas - 18 December 2012) was an American NFL agent and chairman of the Elias Sports Management. Elias was an agent for Michael Brockers, Al Woods, Josh Chapman and Travis Daniels including many more.

References

1971 births
2012 deaths
People from Dallas
American sports agents
Place of death missing